WNWC-FM (102.5 FM, "Life 102.5") is an American radio station broadcasting a contemporary Christian music format. Licensed to Madison, Wisconsin, United States, "Life 102.5" has an AM sister station, "Faith 1190" (WNWC), that broadcasts programs on Christian faith. Both stations are currently owned by University of Northwestern – St. Paul and run by Northwestern Media, a ministry of UNWSP.

WNWC transmits from a tower in Elver Park on Madison's Southwest Side.

Translators
In addition to the main station, WNWC-FM is relayed by an additional 2 broadcast translators to widen its coverage area.

References

External links

Radio stations established in 1959
Contemporary Christian radio stations in the United States
1959 establishments in Wisconsin
NWC-FM